Wagas is a Western cuisine restaurant chain in China, headquartered in Jing'an District, Shanghai.

In 2022 it had 250 restaurants.

History
Originating in Shanghai, it began operations in 1999, established by John Christensen from Denmark. His business partner was an Australian named Jackie Yun.

The company began a bakery chain called Baker & Spice in 2010.

Wagas, by 2016, opened its first Shenzhen location.

In 2021 various investing groups showed interest in purchasing the company. Jollibee, Restaurant Brands International, and Yum China considered acquiring Wagas. In February 2022 Advent International had made moves towards acquiring Wagas. In September 2022 Advent acquired 60%, a controlling stake, in Wagas.

References

External links

 Wagas
 Baker & Spice
Restaurant chains in China
Restaurants established in 1999
Chinese companies established in 1999
Companies based in Shanghai